Jo Anderson (born June 29, 1958) is an American actress, best known for her roles as Diana Bennett in Beauty and the Beast and Julia Ann Mercer in JFK.

Career

Anderson starred opposite Ron Perlman as Diana Bennett in Beauty and the Beast after Linda Hamilton's departure and her character Catherine's death in 1989. She has had guest-starring appearances in many television shows, has appeared in many movies such as Oliver Stone's JFK and Kenneth Branagh's Dead Again, as well as many TV-movies, and guest-starred in TV shows such ER, C.S.I. Miami, Millennium, Northern Exposure, and Glee. She also appeared in two episodes of Perception in 2014.

Selected filmography

TV series

 Miami Vice - TV series, (4x02) "Amen... Send Money" (1987)
 Thirtysomething (1988)
 Dream Street (1989)
 Columbo: Uneasy Lies the Crown (1990)
 Beauty and the Beast (1990)
 Northern Exposure (1992–1993)
 Sisters (1991)
 High Incident (1997)
 Millennium (1997)
 Legacy (1998)
 Roswell (1999–2001)
 The Closer (2005)
 ER (2006)
 C.S.I. (2007)
 C.S.I. Miami (2007)
 Glee (2010)
 Perception (2014)

Movies

 Heaven Help Us (1985)
 Miles from Home (1988)
 Dead Again (1991)
 JFK (1991)
 Season Of Change (1994)
 Daylight (1996)
 Rain (2001)
 Fat Rose and Squeaky (2006)

TV movies

 I Saw What You Did (1988)
 Prime Target (1989)
 Columbo: Uneasy Lies the Crown (1990)
 Decoration Day (1990)
 Jack Reed: Badge of Honor (1993)
 One Woman's Courage (1994)
 Menendez: A Killing in Beverly Hills (1994)
 From the Earth to the Moon (1998)
 The Sky's On Fire (1998)

References

External links

TV.com Summary

Adelphi University alumni
American stage actresses
American television actresses
Living people
Actresses from New York City
1958 births
American film actresses
People from Brooklyn
20th-century American actresses
21st-century American actresses